Munford is a city in Tipton County, Tennessee. The population was 5,927 at the 2010 census, when it was listed as a town.

History 
Beginning as a small village which grew around the Mt. Zion Methodist Episcopal Church in the early 1850s, it was officially named "Mt. Zion" after the opening of a post office there in 1856. This office closed in 1874, and in 1886 when Mt. Zion applied to the United States Post Office Department to have it reopened, the application was approved on the condition that it do so with a new name, to avoid confusion with Mt. Zion, Pennsylvania. At that time Pennsylvania was commonly abbreviated as "Penn" and Tennessee was commonly abbreviated "Tenn." The newly appointed Post Master G. B. Sale asked his daughter Lola to choose a name, and they agreed to name it after Colonel Richard Henry Munford (1807–1884) of Covington, Tennessee. The town was officially incorporated as "Munford" by an act of the Tennessee General Assembly in 1905, and Sterling Hicks Bass, Sr. was elected as its first mayor.

Geography

Demographics

2020 census

As of the 2020 United States census, there were 6,302 people, 2,283 households, and 1,898 families residing in the city.

2010 census
As of the census of 2010, there were 5,927 people, 2,174 households, and 1,667 families residing in the town. The racial makeup of the town was 87.90% White, 7.20% African American, 0.4% Native American, & 1.5% Asian. Hispanic or Latino of any race were 3.00% of the population.

There were 2,174 households, out of which 42.2% had children under the age of 18 living with them, 56.3% were married couples living together, 15.9% had a female householder with no husband present, and 23.3% were non-families. The average household size was 2.73 and the average family size was 3.11.

According to the 2007-2011 American Community Survey, the median household income in Munford was $56,242. 11.9% of all residents were below the poverty line, including 16.5% of those under the age of 18.

Education
Munford Public Schools are part of Tipton County Schools. The Tipton County School District has eight elementary schools, five middle schools and four high schools.

Schools located in Munford include:
Munford Elementary School
Munford Middle School
Munford High School

John Combs is the Director of Schools.

Munford Police Department
The Munford Police Department has several programs including: Neighborhood/Community Watch Program, Home Security Checks, Children's Fingerprint Identification and Photo, Traffic Safety Program, and School Career Day.

The Munford Police Department also has a S.W.A.T. team that is used in high risk situations including: hostage situations, dangerous drug situations, and blocked or "barricaded" subjects.

Munford Fire Department
The fire department serves around 15,000 residents of the Munford and Atoka communities; however, "the department also serves county residents outside the corporate limits, which brings the population base up to an estimated 30,000."

The fire department not only responds to fires, but also respond to a wide range of other emergency situations including motorcycle accidents, medical emergencies, and several others. Every six months, the fire "department also remains up to date with safety inspections of all businesses." The city contains 1,300 fire hydrants, which are provided by the Munford Fire Department.

"The priorities of the department are clear: Life Safety, Emergency Incident Stabilization, and Property Conservation."

Celebrate Munford
Celebrate Munford is a "non-profit group of citizens" in the Munford community, as well as areas surrounding Munford. The group is always looking for new members to lead the events.

Celebrate Munford has been hosting an annual event in downtown Munford for the past 29 years, The Munford Arts and Crafts Fair. The fair is the third Saturday of September every year. The fair lasts all day and is packed full with booths and vendors. Vendors are welcomed to reserve a booth spot. Fair food is also available at several booths. Stages that are booked with entertainers are also at the fair. There are various music styles played and dances performed.

Every Fourth of July, the Celebrate Munford group sponsors the Celebrate Independence. The event is located at the Munford City Park, across from the skate park. The United States Navy band plays for everyone as they picnic and socialize. As the band plays their finale, a firework show begins.

References

External links
 City website

Cities in Tipton County, Tennessee
Cities in Tennessee
Memphis metropolitan area